Keith O'Neill may refer to:
Keith O'Neill (drummer), drummer with the band Cast
Keith O'Neill (footballer) (born 1976), footballer who represented the Republic of Ireland
Keith O'Neill (fiddler), Irish-American fiddler

See also
Keith O'Neil (born 1980), American football linebacker